Satlada is a seven stringed pearl necklace of Indian origin. It traditionally has 465 pearls embedded in it. It can also be set with emeralds, diamonds and rubies.
 Some of the pearls are so large they look like small eggs, or outsized peas. Formerly mainly used in royal families, it is today often chosen as wedding jewelry.

See also 
 Jewels of The Nizams
 Jacob Diamond
 Darya-e Nur

References 

Necklaces